The 2016 Louisville Cardinals football team represented the University of Louisville in the 2016 NCAA Division I FBS football season. The Cardinals were led by then third-year head coach Bobby Petrino, who began his second stint at Louisville in 2014 after eight years away. The team played their home games at Papa John's Cardinal Stadium in Louisville, Kentucky. The Cardinals competed as a member of the Atlantic Division in the Atlantic Coast Conference.

The Cardinals were led by sophomore quarterback Lamar Jackson, who was responsible for 51 touchdowns on the year (30 passing and 21 rushing), which was second in FBS. He was awarded the Heisman Trophy, distinguishing him as the nation's best college football player, becoming the first Louisville player to win the award.

Schedule

Personnel

Roster

Depth chart

Official Depth Chart 2016.

True Freshman
Double Position : *

Rankings

Recruiting
National Signing Day was February 3, 2016.  The Cardinals signed 23 players in total.

Additional Recruiting Sources

Game summaries

Charlotte

   (Q1, 12:03) UL – #8 Lamar Jackson 36 yard run (#36 Evan O'Hara kick) – UL 7–0
   (Q1, 6:49) UL – #7 Reggie Bonnafon 13 yard pass from #8 Lamar Jackson (#36 Evan O'Hara kick) – UL 14–0
   (Q1, 3:47) UL – #34 Jeremy Smith 24 yard pass from #8 Lamar Jackson (#36 Evan O'Hara kick) – UL 21–0
   (Q1, 0:00) UL – #8 Lamar Jackson 1 yard run (#36 Evan O'Hara kick) – UL 28–0
   (Q2, 12:05) UL – #23 Brandon Radcliff 16 yard pass from #8 Lamar Jackson (#36 Evan O'Hara kick) – UL 35–0
   (Q2, 6:27) UL – #27 L.J. Scott 20 yard pass from #8 Lamar Jackson (#36 Evan O'Hara kick) – UL 42–0
   (Q2, 2:59) UL – #17 James Quick 32 yard pass from #8 Lamar Jackson (#36 Evan O'Hara kick) – UL 49–0
   (Q2, 0:05) UL – #18 Cole Hikutini 1 yard pass from #8 Lamar Jackson (#36 Evan O'Hara kick) – UL 56–0
   (Q3, 8:36) CHA – Austin Duke 24 yard pass from Kevin Olsen (Stephen Muscarello kick) – UL 56–7
   (Q3, 4:43) UL – #1 Traveon Samuel 18 yard pass from #14 Kyle Bolin (#36 Evan O'Hara kick) – UL 63–7
   (Q4, 10:16) UL – #5 Seth Dawkins 13 yard pass from #14 Kyle Bolin (#32 Blanton Creque kick) – UL 70–7
   (Q4, 3:46) CHA – Anthony Covington recovered fumble (Stephen Muscarello kick) – UL 70–14

at Syracuse

   (Q1, 14:44) UL – #17 James Quick 72 yard pass from #8 Lamar Jackson (#36 Evan O'Hara kick) – UL 7–0
   (Q1, 12:13) UL – #8 Lamar Jackson 7 yard run (#36 Evan O'Hara kick) – UL 14–0
   (Q1, 10:17) UL – #8 Lamar Jackson 72 yard run (#36 Evan O'Hara kick) – UL 21–0
   (Q1, 6:58) SYR – Brisly Estime 15 yard pass from Eric Dungey (Cole Murphy kick) – UL 21–7
   (Q1, 4:11) UL – #8 Lamar Jackson 13 yard run (#36 Evan O'Hara kick) – UL 28–7
   (Q2, 3:23) UL – #8 Lamar Jackson 9 yard run (#36 Evan O'Hara kick) – UL 35–7
   (Q2, 2:42) SYR – Amba Etta-Tawo 47 yard pass from Eric Dungey (Cole Murphy kick) – UL 35–14
   (Q2, 0:40) SYR – Amba Etta-Tawo 4 yard pass from Eric Dungey (Cole Murphy kick) – UL 35–21
   (Q3, 12:18) UL – #1 Traveon Samuel 21 yard run (#36 Evan O'Hara kick) – UL 42–21
   (Q3, 6:49) SYR – Eric Dungey 1 yard run (Cole Murphy kick) – UL 42–28
   (Q4, 13:16) UL – #36 Evan O'Hara 26 yard field goal – UL 45–28
   (Q4, 10:16) UL – #36 Evan O'Hara 41 yard field goal – UL 48–28
   (Q4, 8:55) UL – #23 Brandon Radcliff 48 yard run (#36 Evan O'Hara kick) – UL 55–28
   (Q4, 7:31) UL – #34 Jeremy Smith 30 yard run (#36 Evan O'Hara kick) – UL 62–28

Florida State

   (Q1, 12:54) UL – #8 Lamar Jackson 2 yard run, (#36 Evan O'Hara kick) – UL 7–0
   (Q1, 4:50) UL – #8 Lamar Jackson 14 yard run, (#36 Evan O'Hara kick) – UL 14–0
   (Q1, 1:41) FSU – Ricky Aguayo 47 yard field goal – UL 14–3
   (Q2, 10:56) FSU – Auden Tate 20 yard pass from Deondre Francois, (Ricky Aguayo kick) – UL 14–10
   (Q2, 7:40) UL – #9 Jaylen Smith 2 yard run, (#36 Evan O'Hara kick) – UL 21–10
   (Q2, 5:03) UL – #9 Jaylen Smith 4 yard pass from #8 Lamar Jackson, (#36 Evan O'Hara kick) – UL 28–10
   (Q2, 0:12) UL – #8 Lamar Jackson 1 yard run, (#36 Evan O'Hara kick) – UL 35–10
   (Q3, 13:49) UL – #10 Jaire Alexander 69 yard punt return (#36 Evan O'Hara kick) – UL 42–10
   (Q3, 5:02) UL – #9 Jaylen Smith 1 yard run, (#36 Evan O'Hara kick) – UL 49–10
   (Q4, 14:27) UL – #8 Lamar Jackson 47 yard run, (#36 Evan O'Hara kick) – UL 56–10
   (Q4, 12:30) UL – #23 Brandon Radcliff 6 yard run, (#36 Evan O'Hara kick) – UL 63–10
   (Q4, 5:19) FSU – Auden Tate 12 yard pass from J.J. Cosentino, (Ricky Aguayo kick) – UL 63–17
   (Q4, 0:51) FSU – Ricky Aguayo 33 yard field goal – UL 63–20

at Marshall

   (Q1, 10:57) UL – #17 James Quick 71 yard pass from #8 Lamar Jackson (#32 Blanton Creque kick) – UL 7–0
   (Q2, 11:10) UL – #18 Cole Hikutini 8 yard pass from #8 Lamar Jackson (#32 Blanton Creque kick) – UL 14–0
   (Q2, 5:02) UL – #18 Cole Hikutini 30 yard pass from #8 Lamar Jackson (#32 Blanton Creque kick) – UL 21–0
   (Q2, 3:14) UL – #8 Lamar Jackson 4 yard run (#32 Blanton Creque kick) – UL 28–0
   (Q2, 0:36) MAR – Ryan Yurachek 16 yard pass from Garet Morrell (Amoreto Curraj kick) – UL 28–7
   (Q2, 0:02) UL – #7 Reggie Bonnafon 8 yard pass from #8 Lamar Jackson (#32 Blanton Creque kick) – UL 35–7
   (Q3, 12:33) UL – #8 Lamar Jackson 9 yard run (#32 Blanton Creque kick) – UL 42–7
   (Q3, 5:01) UL – #32 Blanton Creque 39 yard field goal – UL 45–7
   (Q3, 2:19) UL – #9 Jaylen Smith 51 yard pass from #8 Lamar Jackson (#32 Blanton Creque kick) – UL 52–7
   (Q4, 13:40) MAR – Keion Davis 12 yard pass from Garet Morrell (Amoreto Curraj kick) – UL 52–14
   (Q4, 13:25) MAR – Ty Tyler 26 fumble return (Amoreto Curraj kick) – UL 52–21
   (Q4, 6:36) UL – #23 Brandon Radcliff 10 yard run (#32 Blanton Creque kick) – UL 59–21
   (Q4, 2:41) MAR – Tony Pittman 13 yard run (Amoreto Curraj kick) – UL 59–28

at Clemson

   (Q2, 14:18) UL – #34 Jeremy Smith 1 yard run (#32 Blanton Creque kick) – UL 7–0
   (Q2, 7:48) CLEM – Deon Cain 37 yard pass from Deshaun Watson (Greg Huegel kick) – UL 7–7
   (Q2, 6:09) CLEM – Wayne Gallman 24 yard run (Greg Huegel kick) – CLEM 14–7
   (Q2, 3:47) CLEM – Deon Cain 33 yard pass from Deshaun Watson (Greg Huegel kick) – CLEM 21–7
   (Q2, 0:37) UL – #32 Blanton Creque 26 yard field goal – CLEM 21–10
   (Q2, 0:05) CLEM – Artavis Scott 5 yard pass from Deshaun Watson (Greg Huegel kick) – CLEM 28–10
   (Q3, 11:20) UL – #17 James Quick 8 yard pass from #8 Lamar Jackson – CLEM 28–16
   (Q3, 5:21) UL – #32 Blanton Creque 21 yard field goal – CLEM 28–19
   (Q3, 0:45) UL – #8 Lamar Jackson 1 yard run (#32 Blanton Creque kick) – CLEM 28–26
   (Q4, 10:23) UL – #32 Blanton Creque 28 yard field goal – UL 29–28
   (Q4, 7:52) UL – #8 Lamar Jackson 11 yard run (#32 Blanton Creque kick) – UL 36–28
   (Q4, 7:05) CLEM – Mike Williams 20 yard pass from Deshaun Watson – UL 36–34
   (Q4, 3:14) CLEM – Jordan Leggett 31 yard pass from Deshaun Watson (2pts) – CLEM 42–36

Duke

   (Q1, 11:11) UL – #9 Jaylen Smith 5 yard pass from #8 Lamar Jackson (#36 Evan O'Hara kick) – UL 7–0
   (Q1, 6:06) DUKE – Erich Schneider 9 yard pass from Daniel Jones (AJ Reed kick) – UL 7–7
   (Q2, 14:51) UL – #36 Evan O'Hara 22 yard field goal – UL 10–7
   (Q3, 10:50) UL – #34 Jeremy Smith 80 yard run (#36 Evan O'Hara kick) – UL 17–7
   (Q4, 6:34) DUKE – Johnathan Lloyd 20 yard pass from Daniel Jones (AJ Reed kick) – UL 17–14
   (Q4, 1:32) UL – #8 Lamar Jackson 2 yard run (#36 Evan O'Hara kick) – UL 24–14

NC State

   (Q1, 13:27) UL – #8 Lamar Jackson 36 yard run, (#32 Blanton Creque kick) – UL 7–0
   (Q1, 11:20) UL – #32 Blanton Creque 37 yard field goal – UL 10–0
   (Q1, 5:21) UL – #9 Jaylen Smith 74 yard pass from #8 Lamar Jackson, (#32 Blanton Creque kick) – UL 17–0
   (Q2, 14:48) UL – #32 Blanton Creque 33 yard field goal – UL 20–0
   (Q2, 10:09) UL – #34 Jeremy Smith 1 yard run, (#32 Blanton Creque kick) – UL 27–0
   (Q2, 3:57) UL – #18 Cole Hikutini 3 yard pass from #8 Lamar Jackson, (#32 Blanton Creque kick) – UL 34–0
   (Q2, 3:09) UL – #2 Jamari Staples 2 yard pass from #8 Lamar Jackson, (#32 Blanton Creque kick) – UL 41–0
   (Q2, 0:39) UL – #32 Blanton Creque 24 yard field goal – UL 44–0
   (Q3, 5:55) NCST – Kelvin Harmon 14 yard pass from Ryan Finley, (Kyle Bambard kick) – UL 44–7
   (Q3, 1:14) NCST – Maurice Trowell 70 yard pass from Ryan Finley – UL 44–13
   (Q4, 9:14) UL – #34 Jeremy Smith 1 yard run, (#32 Blanton Creque kick) – UL 51–13
   (Q4, 3:46) UL – #32 Blanton Creque 27 yard field goal – UL 54–13

at Virginia

   (Q1, 10:23) UVA – Sam Hayward 27 yard field goal – UVA 3–0
   (Q1, 3:41) UL – #2 Jamari Staples 15 yard pass from #8 Lamar Jackson (#32 Blanton Creque kick) – UL 7–3
   (Q1, 1:26) UVA – Doni Dowling 9 yard pass from Kurt Benkert (Sam Hayward kick) – UVA 10–7
   (Q2, 9:42) UVA – Olamide Zaccheaus 9 yard pass from Kurt Benkert (Sam Hayward kick) – UVA 17–7
   (Q2, 4:08) UL – #7 Reggie Bonnafon 8 yard pass from #8 Lamar Jackson (#32 Blanton Creque kick) – UVA 17–14
   (Q4, 13:52) UL – #7 Reggie Bonnafon 10 yard pass from #8 Lamar Jackson (#32 Blanton Creque kick) – UL 21–17
   (Q4, 8:13) UL – #32 Blanton Creque 32 yard field goal – UL 24–17
   (Q4, 2:00) UVA – Doni Dowling 9 yard pass from Kurt Benkert (2pts) – UVA 25–24
   (Q4, 0:18) UL – #9 Jaylen Smith 29 yard pass from #8 Lamar Jackson (2pts) – UL 32–25

at Boston College

   (Q1, 13:55) UL – #8 Lamar Jackson 69 yard run (#32 Blanton Creque kick) – UL 7–0
   (Q1, 9:13) UL – #17 James Quick 30 yard pass from #8 Lamar Jackson (#32 Blanton Creque kick) – UL 14–0
   (Q1, 0:57) UL – #9 Jaylen Smith 44 yard pass from #8 Lamar Jackson (#32 Blanton Creque kick) – UL 21–0
   (Q2, 14:50) UL – #17 James Quick 10 yard pass from #8 Lamar Jackson (#32 Blanton Creque kick) – UL 28–0
   (Q2, 6:22) UL – #18 Cole Hikutini 5 yard pass from #8 Lamar Jackson (#32 Blanton Creque kick) – UL 35–0
   (Q2, 0:06) UL – #32 Blanton Creque 26 yard field goal – UL 38–0
   (Q3, 11:45) BC – Tyler Rouse 39 yard pass from Patrick Towles (Mike Knoll kick) – UL 38–7
   (Q3, 8:19) UL – #8 Lamar Jackson 13 yard run (#32 Blanton Creque kick) – UL 45–7
   (Q3, 1:57) UL – #8 Lamar Jackson 53 yard run (#32 Blanton Creque kick) – UL 52–7

Wake Forest

   (Q1, 11:24) WF – Mike Weaver 37 yard field goal – WF 3–0
   (Q1, 5:27) WF – Mike Weaver 45 yard field goal – WF 6–0
   (Q2, 8:19) WF – Mike Weaver 33 yard field goal – WF 9–0
   (Q2, 2:49) WF – Mike Weaver 38 yard field goal – WF 12–0
   (Q2, 0:18) UL – #32 Blanton Creque 26 yard field goal – WF 12–3
   (Q3, 7:30) UL – #23 Brandon Radcliff 55 yard run (#32 Blanton Creque kick) – WF 12–10
   (Q4, 10:35) UL – #23 Brandon Radcliff 7 yard run (2pt failed) – UL 16–12
   (Q4, 7:36) UL – #23 Brandon Radcliff 19 yard run (#32 Blanton Creque kick) – UL 23–12
   (Q4, 4:05) UL – #18 Cole Hikutini 2 yard pass from #8 Lamar Jackson (#32 Blanton Creque kick) – UL 30–12
   (Q4, 3:44) UL – #20 Ronald Walker 31 yard interception return (#32 Blanton Creque kick) – UL 37–12
   (Q4, 0:50) UL – #29 Malik Williams 2 yard run (#32 Blanton Creque kick) – UL 44–12

at Houston

   (Q1, 11:24) UH – Duke Catalon 13 yard pass from Greg Ward Jr. (Ty Cummings kick) – UH 7–0
   (Q1, 11:24) UH – Ty Cummings 33 yard field goal – UH 10–0
   (Q2, 12:18) UH – Duke Catalon 13 yard pass from Greg Ward Jr. (Ty Cummings kick) – UH 17–0
   (Q2, 6:53) UH – Duke Catalon 2 yard run (Ty Cummings kick) – UH 24–0
   (Q2, 5:13) UH – Chance Allen 50 yard pass from Linell Bonner (Ty Cummings kick) – UH 31–0
   (Q3, 10:02) UL – #18 Cole Hikutini 12 yard pass from #8 Lamar Jackson (#32 Blanton Creque kick) – UH 31–7
   (Q4, 14:51) UL – #32 Blanton Creque 26 yard field goal – UH 31–10
   (Q4, 5:57) UH – Ty Cummings 46 yard field goal – UH 34–10
   (Q4, 3:55) UH – Team Safety – UH 36–10

Kentucky

LSU–Citrus Bowl

   (Q1, 7:14) UL – Blanton Creque 24 yard field goal – UL 3–0
   (Q2, 14:54) LSU – Colin Heter 1 yard pass from Danny Etling (Colby Delahoussaye kick)- LSU 7–3
   (Q2, 7:14) LSU – Derrius Guice 1 yard pass from Danny Etling (Colby Delahoussaye kick)- LSU 14–3
   (Q2, 1:08) LSU – Lamar Jackson tackled in end zone for a safety by Arden Key- LSU 16–3
   (Q2, 0:00) UL – Blanton Creque 47 yard Field Goal – LSU 16–6
   (Q3, 8:48) LSU – Derrius Guice 70 yard run (Colby Delahoussaye kick)- LSU 23–6
   (Q3, 3:04) LSU – Colby Delahoussaye 42 yard field goal – LSU 26–6
   (Q4, 14:43) UL – Blanton Creque 30 yard field goal – LSU 26–9
   (Q4, 10:38) LSU – Colby Delahoussaye 25 yard field goal – LSU 29–9

References

Louisville
Louisville Cardinals football seasons
Louisville Cardinals football